Traumatology is a quarterly peer-reviewed medical journal that covers research in the field of traumatology. The editor-in-chief is Regardt J. Ferreira PhD. It was established in 1995 and was published by SAGE Publications until December 2013. The American Psychological Association now publishes the journal.

Abstracting and indexing 
The journal is abstracted and indexed in PILOTS, PsycINFO, and SafetyLit.

External links 
 

American Psychological Association academic journals
English-language journals
Clinical psychology journals

Publications established in 1995
Quarterly journals